Seo Soon-seok(Korean:서순석) (born May 12, 1971 in Osan) is a South Korean wheelchair curler.

He participated at the 2014 and 2018 Winter Paralympics where South Korean team finished on ninth and fourth places respectively.

Wheelchair curling teams and events

References

External links 

Profile at the 2014 Winter Paralympics site (web archive)

Living people
1971 births
People from Osan
South Korean male curlers
South Korean wheelchair curlers
Paralympic wheelchair curlers of South Korea
Wheelchair curlers at the 2014 Winter Paralympics
Wheelchair curlers at the 2018 Winter Paralympics
Sportspeople from Gyeonggi Province
21st-century South Korean people